Regional Institute of Education, Bhubaneswar a constituent unit of National Council of Educational Research and Training, New Delhi, caters to the educational needs of teachers of Eastern Indian region. It provides academic and technical support to the state of Odisha, West Bengal, Bihar, Jharkhand, Assam, Arunachal Pradesh, Sikkim, Manipur, Mizoram, Meghalaya, Tripura, Nagaland and Andaman and Nicobar Islands. The institute act as a regional resource centre for all areas of education, especially school education. UNESCO Bangkok has declared Regional Institute of Education, Bhubaneswar as a resource centre for ICT.

Departments

Department of Education
Educational Technology
Special Education
Physical Education
Psychology Laboratory

Department of Education in Science & Mathematics
Physics
Chemistry
Mathematics
Botany
Zoology
Agriculture
Teaching Learning Aids Center / SUPW Cell
Population Education Cell

Department of Education in Social Science & Humanities
Hindi
English
Odia
Bengali
Geography
History
Political Science
Economics

Department of Extension Education

Computer Application Center

SSA Cell

Demonstration Multipurpose School

The Demonstration Multipurpose School is an integral part of Regional Institute of Education, Bhubaneswar and act as a laboratory for trying out innovative practices in school education and teacher education. The school is affiliated to the Central Board of Secondary Education, New Delhi. It imparts education from classes 1 to 12 in English medium.

Courses
4 year integrated B.Sc. B.Ed
4 year integrated B.A. B.Ed
2 year B.Ed.(Arts & Science)
2 year M.Ed.
1 year M.Phil.(Education)
DCGC
Pre-Ph.D.[Education]

Library
The institute's library has  more than 70,000 documents, which includes about 59,000 books, 1000 bound volumes of periodicals, 300 reports, 580 dissertations, 100 maps. It subscribes around 77 Indian and foreign journals and 16 daily newspapers every year. An average of 550 new books are being added to the library in each year.

Laboratory
The institute has three chemistry laboratories, two physics laboratories and one dark room for optical experiments. The institute also houses one lab each for botany and zoology. The labs are well equipped with sufficient number of apparatuses and modern electronic devices. There is also a biological museum which puts into display a number of biological specimens. There are also two computer laboratories and one state-of-the-art ICT studio.

Hostel
The institute has hostel facilities too, well within its campus. The names of the hostels operated by the Institute are, viz.,
Homibhaba Hostel (for boys)
Gopabandhu Hostel (for girls)
Ramanujan Hostel (for girls)
Ashutosh Hostel (for girls)
 Sarojini Hostel (for girls)

Photo gallery

References

External links
RIE, Bhubaneswar

Colleges of education in India
1963 establishments in Orissa
Education in Bhubaneswar
Educational institutions established in 1963